is a former Japanese football player.

Playing career
Azuma was born in Wakayama Prefecture on August 29, 1977. After graduating from Komazawa University, he joined J2 League club Ventforet Kofu in 2000. Although he could hardly play in the match behind Tomohiko Ito in 2000, he played many matches in 2001. However he could not play at all in the match behind new member Tatsuya Tsuruta in 2002 and retired end of 2002 season.

Club statistics

References

External links

1977 births
Living people
Komazawa University alumni
Association football people from Wakayama Prefecture
Japanese footballers
J2 League players
Ventforet Kofu players
Association football goalkeepers